Sebastián Cardozo Coitinho (born 9 September 1995) is a Uruguayan footballer who plays as a centre back for La Luz.

References

External links

1995 births
Living people
Uruguayan footballers
Uruguayan expatriate footballers
Association football defenders
Racing Club de Montevideo players
Villa Teresa players
Albion F.C. players
Inter Playa del Carmen players
Glacis United F.C. players
Club Sportivo Cerrito players
Uruguayan Primera División players
Uruguayan Segunda División players
Uruguayan expatriate sportspeople in Mexico
Expatriate footballers in Mexico
Expatriate footballers in Gibraltar
La Luz F.C. players